was a town located in Nishiyatsushiro District, Yamanashi Prefecture, Japan.

As of 2003, the town had an estimated population of 10,421 and a population density of 322.43 persons per km2.

On October 1, 2005, Ichikawadaimon, along with the towns of Mitama and Rokugō (all from Nishiyatsushiro District), was merged to create the town of Ichikawamisato.

External links
 Ichikawamisato official website 

Dissolved municipalities of Yamanashi Prefecture
Ichikawamisato, Yamanashi